Mariano Alonso Alonso (Madrid, 11 October 1899 – 3 July 1974) was a Spanish military officer and colonial administrator, governor of Spanish Guinea and Spanish Sahara, and Captain General of the Balearic Islands during the Francoist regime.

Biography 
In 1914 Alonso entered the Toledo Infantry Academy, from which he graduated in 1917 with the rank of lieutenant. In November 1920 he was assigned to the indigenous police of the Spanish protectorate in Morocco, until 1924 when he was promoted to captain. During these years he learned Arabic.

The Spanish coup of July 1936 caught Alonso in Tétouan, and from there he left for Ifni, joining the Nationalist faction in the Spanish Civil War. In May 1937 he was promoted to commander, and in July 1937 he was promoted to lieutenant colonel. He took an active part in the Battle of Brunete and at the end of the Civil War was appointed Delegate of  until January 1942, when he was appointed Governor of Spanish Guinea, serving in Santa Isabel until 1944. In September 1952 he was promoted to brigadier general and in November 1956 to major general. In July 1958 he was appointed Governor of Spanish Sahara; he left the position in El Aaiún in October 1961, when he was promoted to lieutenant general and appointed Captain General of the Balearic Islands. Since then he has been a councilor at the Spanish Council of State, representing the Spanish Army.

References 

1899 births
1974 deaths
Military personnel from Madrid
20th-century Spanish military personnel
Spanish colonial governors and administrators
History of Equatorial Guinea
History of Western Sahara
Spanish captain generals
Spanish military personnel of the Spanish Civil War (National faction)